Artemisia umbelliformis  also known as white genepì and genepì blanco is a small herb of the family Asteraceae.

Usage
It is sought for the production of liquor Génépi.  The leaves are used in the preparation of a tea and are sometimes also used as a condiment.

Synonyms
Artemisia eriantha Ten.
Artemisia gabriellae Br.-Bl. (1945) 
Artemisia genipi subsp. eriantha
Artemisia laxa Fritsch (1893)
Artemisia laxiflora St-Lager (1889)
Artemisia mutellina Vill. (1779)
Artemisia oligantha Miégeville (1872) 
Artemisia petrosa (Baumg.) Jan
Artemisia villarsii Gren. & Godr.

Hybrids
In Italy this species  can hybridize easily with Artemisia genipi Weber, Artemisia glacialis L., Artemisia nitida Bertol., and Artemisia lanata Willd ..
Other interspecific hybrids:

Artemisia × albertii Petitmengin (1906) - Hybrid with: Artemisia absinthium
Artemisia × pampaninii Vaccari (1904) - Hybrid with: Artemisia nana
Artemisia × perrieri Petitmengin (1906) - Hybrid with: Artemisia campestris
Artemisia × seileri FO Wolf (1892) - Hybrid with: Artemisia glacialis
Artemisia × sylviana FO Wolf (1892) - Hybrid with: Artemisia genipi

References

umbelliformis
Taxa named by Jean-Baptiste Lamarck